Whitaker Mountain is a mountain summit in Cherokee County in the state of South Carolina (SC) and is one of the three mountain peaks in Cherokee County. Whitaker Mountain is located within the town of Blacksburg, South Carolina.

External links 
Whitaker Mountain Summit - South Carolina Mountain Peak Information

Landforms of Cherokee County, South Carolina
Mountains of South Carolina
Inselbergs of Piedmont (United States)